Antoni Panyovski (born 27 February 1942) is a Bulgarian modern pentathlete. He competed at the 1968 Summer Olympics.

References

External links
 

1942 births
Living people
Bulgarian male modern pentathletes
Olympic modern pentathletes of Bulgaria
Modern pentathletes at the 1968 Summer Olympics
Sportspeople from Sofia